Gelvonai is a town in Širvintos district municipality, Vilnius County, east Lithuania. According to the Lithuanian census of 2011, the town has a population of 284 people. The town has a Catholic church.

Its alternate names include Gelvonay, Gelvonis, Gelvony, Gelvonys, Giełwany (Polish), and Gelvan (Yiddish).

Famous citizens 
Antanas Baranauskas, Lithuanian poet, mathematician, and Catholic bishop.

References

Towns in Vilnius County
Towns in Lithuania